Rob Thomas is an American alternative rock singer and songwriter. Along with releasing albums as the lead singer for Matchbox Twenty, Thomas has released five solo studio albums, two extended plays, and eighteen singles.

Thomas' debut album, ...Something to Be, was released on April 5, 2005. It peaked at number one on the US Billboard 200, as well as charting to number on the Australian albums chart. The album featured the Top 10 single "Lonely No More", which peaked at number 6 on the Billboard Hot 100. The song was soon after certified gold by the Recording Industry Association of America. ...Something to Be was subsequently certified platinum by the Recording Industry Association of America.

Cradlesong, Thomas' second album, was released in June 2009. It peaked at number 3 on the Billboard 200. Four singles were released, including the single "Her Diamonds", Thomas' second Top 40 single on the Hot 100. The three additional singles released all failed to crack the Top 40 in the US, but the album was eventually certified Gold by the Recording Industry Association of America.

Other than recording solo albums and albums with Matchbox Twenty, Thomas was also featured on "Smooth", a 1999 single by Santana. The song was an international success, peaking within the Top 20 of several countries around the world, including becoming a number one single on the Billboard Hot 100. In 2010, Thomas was once again featured on a Santana song. "Sunshine of Your Love" was released as a single from Santana's album, Guitar Heaven: The Greatest Guitar Classics of All Time.

Albums

Studio albums

Video albums

Extended plays

Singles

Featured singles

Music videos

Other appearances

Notes

References

Discography
Discographies of American artists
Pop music discographies
Rock music discographies